The 1904 News of the World Match Play was the second News of the World Match Play tournament. It was played from Tuesday 4 to Thursday 6 October at Mid-Surrey Golf Club. 32 players competed in a straight knock-out competition, with each match contested over 18 holes, except for the final which was over 36 holes. The winner received £100 out of a total prize fund of £240. J.H. Taylor defeated Alfred Toogood 5 & 3 in the final to win the tournament.

Qualification
Entry was restricted to members of the Professional Golfers' Association (PGA). Qualification was by a series of 36-hole stroke-play competitions; one for each of the five PGA sections. The Southern section had 16 qualifiers, the Northern section had 6, the Midland 5, the Scottish section 3 and the Irish section 2. In the event of a tie for places there was a playoff. Compared to 1903 the Northern section had one additional qualifier and the Scottish section one less.

The qualifiers were:

Irish section: George Coburn, Johnnie McKenna
Midland section: George Cawsey, William Hutchings, Willie Lewis, Wilfrid Reid, Tom Williamson
Northern section: Fred Collins, Phil Gaudin, Sandy Herd, George Pulford, Ted Ray, Tom Simpson
Southern section: James Braid, Harry Chestney, Ernest Gray, James Hepburn, Willie Hunter, Sr., Rowland Jones, James Kinnell, Arthur Mitchell, Jack Ross, Jack Rowe, J.H. Taylor, Robert Thomson, Albert Tingey, Sr., Alfred Toogood, Harry Vardon, Tom Yeoman
Scottish section: Willie Fernie, Arnaud Massy, Ben Sayers

Format
The format was unchanged. Matches were over 18 holes except for the final which was over 36 holes. Extra holes were played in the event of a tied match. Two rounds were played on the first day, two more on the second day with the final on the third day.

Results
Source:

w/o = Walkover

Prize money
Prize money was increased to £240 with the addition of 8 £5 prizes for the losers in the second round. The winner received £100 and a gold medal, the runner-up £30 and a silver medal, the losing semi-finalists £15 and a bronze medal, while the third round losers received £10 and the second round losers received £5.

References

Golf tournaments in England
News of the World Match Play
News of the World Match Play
News of the World Match Play
News of the World Match Play